Vivaha Bhojanambu may refer to 

Vivaha Bhojanambu, a song from the 1957 Telugu film Mayabazar
Vivaha Bhojanambu (1988 film), a 1988 Indian Telugu-language film
Vivaha Bhojanambu (2021 film), a 2021 Indian Telugu-language film
Vivaha Bhojanambu, a restaurant chain in Hyderabad owned by actor Sundeep Kishan